Mwanga Kaskazini is an administrative ward in Kigoma-Ujiji District of Kigoma Region in Tanzania. 
In 2016 the Tanzania National Bureau of Statistics report there were 26,620 people in the ward, from 24,184 in 2012.

Villages / neighborhoods 
The ward has 3 neighborhoods.
 Kisangani
 Mlole
 Ujenzi

References

Wards of Kigoma Region